Toluca , officially Toluca de Lerdo , is the state capital of the State of Mexico as well as the seat of the Municipality of Toluca. With a population of 910,608 as of the 2020 census, Toluca is the fifth most populous city in Mexico. The city forms the core of the Greater Toluca metropolitan area, which with a combined population of 2,347,692 forms the fifth most populous metropolitan area in the country.

Etymology

When Toluca was founded by the Matlatzincas, its original name was Nepintahihui (land of corn). The current name is based on the Náhuatl name for the area when it was renamed by the Aztecs in 1473. The name has its origin in the word tollocan that comes from the name of the god, Tolo, plus the locative suffix, can, to denote "place of Tolo". It is also referred to in a number of Aztec codices as Tolutépetl, meaning hill of the god, Tolo, an allusion to the nearby volcano. The name Toluca de Lerdo was adopted in 1861 in honor of President Sebastián Lerdo de Tejada.

History

Pre-Columbian era

The Valley of Toluca was known as Matlatzinco Valley in ancient times and home to at least four linguistic groups: the Matlatzinca, Otomi, Mazahua, and Nahua peoples. In the Postclassic period, the valley was ruled by a large powerful capital city whose ruins are located today in the village of Calixtlahuaca, just north of the city of Toluca. In 1478 the Mexica emperor Axayacatl conquered the Toluca Valley. The capital was stripped of its dynasty and power and some lands were distributed to kings and nobles from the Valley of Mexico.

One of the rivals of Calixtlahuaca was Tollocan, a minor city-state before 1478. When Axayacatl destroyed Calixtlahuaca, he placed the imperial provincial capital in Tollocan. Calixtlahuaca and other towns in the Toluca Valley paid tribute to the Aztec Empire through Tollocan. After the Spanish conquest, the name Tollocan was changed to Toluca. Archaeologists have not yet located a major Postclassic settlement within the modern city. Either the pre-Hispanic city of Tollocan was destroyed and covered over by the expansion of Toluca, or else the remains of Tollocan could lie outside of the modern city. A small Postclassic site was discovered on the hill called Tolochi, which is in the north of the modern city, but the remains seem too insubstantial to have been a major provincial capital. The tree of "Las Manitas Rojas", which literally means "little red hands", was planted before the Spanish Conquest in what is now the monastery of Nuestra Señora del Carmen. This tree is significant because it shows that Toluca was important enough for the Aztecs to create a botanical garden.

Colonial period

In 1521, the Spanish conquered the Valley of Toluca. Leading the troops was Gonzalo de Sandoval, one of Cortes' many sergeants. Toluca's first governor was Pedro Cortés Coyotzin. The Valley of Toluca and what is now the city of Toluca were included in the concession made by King Carlos V of Spain to Hernán Cortés.

In 1524, the evangelization process started in Toluca. The most notable figure of this effort is Fray Andrés Castro, from Burgos, the old capital of Castile, by making a great number of improvements to the city and being the first one to learn the native Matlatzincan language. The friar was well loved by the Matlazinca people, as he worked to protect them from the injustices of the early colonial period. He is remembered to this day with a plaza that bears his name which includes a sculpture depicting him. A Spanish community was established in 1530, but it was not until 1677 that Toluca was categorized as a town. In 1793, the construction of a road to Mexico City was started. Although Toluca was recognized as a city as early as 1662, only in 1799, was Toluca officially named a city by the King Carlos IV of Spain on September 12.

Independence and post-independence

In 1810, at the beginning of the independence movement, Miguel Hidalgo stayed in Toluca for a few days on his way to the Battle of Monte de las Cruces. In 1811, a group of indigenous natives of Mexico was shot and killed by Spanish royalists.  In memorial to those who were killed in this incident, the place where this occurred was named "Plaza of the Martires".  In 1812, the first city council of Toluca was installed.  In 1821, independence was proclaimed by the local authorities.

After the creation of the State of Mexico in 1825, the state capital moved to different cities several times. until in 1830, Toluca was finally designated as the constitutional capital of the State of Mexico. In 1832, the building of "Los Portales" was started in downtown Toluca. In 1836, because of the centralization of the Mexican federal government, all branches of government were relocated to Mexico City after some were in Toluca for several years.

In 1847, thanks to Ignacio Ramírez, "El Nigromante" or the Institute of Literature opened. In 1851, the "Teatro Principal" was built by González Arratia. Mariano Riva Palacio was named governor of the state and he started the most important modernization process of the city in the 19th century. In 1881, The Industrial Union was founded, the railroad was opened and the Bank of State of Mexico created the first bills in the country. In 1882, the Teachers College was founded. In 1910, people celebrated a century of Independence, and the Plaza España was inaugurated.

Geography

The municipality is bordered by the municipalities of Almoloya de Juárez, Temoaya, Otzolotepec, Xonacatlán, Lerma, San Mateo Atenco, Metepec, Calimaya, Tenango del Valle, Villa Guerrero and Zinacantepec.

The Lerma River flows from Lake Almoloya del Río through the center of the municipality towards the west, flowing into Lake Chapala. From this point westward the river takes the name of Río Grande de Santiago. And it goes from this lake to the Pacific Ocean in the state of Nayarit. The god Tolo was supposed to reside in the volcano's crater. Its original indigenous name was Chignahualtecatl which means "Nine Mountains" but later was named Xinantecatl which means "naked man", because the silhouette of its crater resembles a sleeping man, before the Spaniards named it Nevado, meaning "snow-covered". It is a place of increasing sporting activity, such as mountain biking, climbing, and high altitude running. It is the only volcano in Mexico that has two lagoons and can be reached by automobile. There have been proposals to turn this mountain into a ski hill because of its accessibility and the low temperatures that exist on the mountain throughout the year, but recent reports on global warming have raised fears that the snow cap on the mountain will disappear completely within a few decades. The park has forest land, especially of pines and obeto trees. The prevalent animals are camp rats, teporingos, squirrels, tlacuaches, lizards, snakes, and eagles. On the lower part of this mountain there are picnic tables and BBQ grills. In the higher part of the volcano (inside) there are two lagoons in which visitors can practice scuba-diving and fishing. This volcano is unique in Mexico in that one can enter the crater by car.

This is a reforested area with a small artificial lake, a picnic area and playground.

Climate
Under the Köppen climate classification, Toluca features a subtropical highland climate (Cwb), with relatively cool, dry winters, and mild, wet, humid summers. Freezing temperatures are common during winter.  Toluca's climate is the coolest of any large Mexican city due to its altitude ( above sea level). Winter nights are cold and the temperature may drop below . Throughout the year, the temperature is rarely below  or above .

The climate is prone to extended dry periods particularly in the winter. Almost nine-tenths of the annual rainfall occurs between June and September. Just outside the heavily industrialized city, the municipality has forests with oak, pine, fir, cedar, cypress and other flora, characteristic of the temperate zone of central Mexico.

Economy

In colonial times, Toluca first gained economic importance as a producer of smoked and cured meats, especially chorizo sausage. The nearby town of Lerma still carries on this tradition.  However, since that time, Toluca's economy has expanded far beyond sausage to become one of the most industrialized areas in Mexico. Its geographic position in the center of the country and proximity to Mexico City as well as its well-developed infrastructure, have allowed Toluca to grow into a major industrial zone for the state. Toluca began consolidating in the 1940s, but the most intense industrialization began in the 1950s and continued through most of the 1980s. The growth and industrialization of Toluca is closely tied to the growth and changes in economic activities that have occurred in the Mexico City metropolitan area.  Most industrial enterprises are on the small and micro-level but the city has attracted a large number of international corporations. Major products produced include food processing, metals and machinery, paper products, printed matter as well as auto production.  The industrial base of the Toluca metropolitan area employs over 33% of the municipality's population and 6% of the entire state's population.

Outside of the metropolitan area, the economy is still based on agriculture and livestock, with some income from tourism. Only a little over four percent of the total municipal population engages in agriculture raising corn, wheat, beans, potatoes, peas, fava beans and oats on a little over half of the municipality's territory. Livestock raising is a greater source of income with 10,286 sites producing cattle, pigs, sheep and domestic fowl. Tourism is based on the Nevado de Toluca volcano and the archeological zone of Calixtlahuaca.  Despite being little known internationally, they manage to represent about 50% of the state's tourism income.

Toluca lies in the southern part of the valley and its economic influence is most strongly felt in the southern and central parts of the valley.  The northern parts of the valley have closer ties to Atlacomulco. The core metropolitan area of Toluca consists of the municipalities of Toluca, Lerma, Metepec, San Mateo Atenco, Ocoyoacac and Zinacantepec. The economic interdependence of these municipalities are most similar to that of the communities in the Mexico City metropolitan area. There are two "outer spheres" of the metropolitan area.  The first consists of the municipalities of Almoloya del Río, Capulhuac, Mexicaltzingo, San Antonio la Isla, Tenango del Valle and Xonacatlán.  The furthest sphere consists of Santiago Tianguistenco, Santa María Rayón, Santa Cruz Atizapán and Chapultepec, México. These spheres are defined not only by geographical distance but also by population growth and rate of urbanization.

Industrial zone

Toluca is located in the economic center of Mexico. Toluca has become an important economic city because of its industries and infrastructure that produce drinks, food, textiles, cars, electric products and such. Since 1944, many industries have settled in Toluca rather than in other cities. In 1965, the industrial zone of Toluca-Lerma-Tianguistenco, which is located on the north side of Toluca, began to attract industries to the area. The city now has five additional major industrial parks:  Industrial Toluca, Parque Industrial Lerma, Parque Industrial Exportec I., Parque Industrial Exportec II and the Parque Industrial El Coecillo.

Chrysler's Toluca Car Assembly has manufactured automobiles since 1968. The  complex — where the FIAT 500 is assembled — employs 2300 people. Other companies located here or that have industrial parks in Toluca are BMW, Mercedes Benz, Coca-Cola, Femsa, Grupo Bimbo, Nissan, Nestlé, Pfizer, Bayer, Crisa, Barcel, Knorr, Trelleborg Automotive, and HSBC. Many of those aforementioned companies have complete manufacturing and R&D facilities in the Toluca industrial park. Mercedes-Benz manufactures the C-Class, E-Class, G-Class, here and upgrades the GL-Class, S-Class and CLS-Class to armored vehicles at this facility. BMW manufactures its 3, 5, 7 and X5 series and also offers armored variants.

Transportation

Road
Toluca has an infrastructure of highways that connect the city with the main cities of the country as well as its international Airport, and inter-city bus Station.

The Libramiento (bypass) Toluca is a project to directly connect the Toluca-Mexico City highway to the east of the city to the Toluca-Atlacomulco highway the extends north.  It will permit easier access to the airport as well as a bypass route for traffic heading from Mexico City to the west and northwest.  The libramiento is already complete, but it is not used by many people because of the high tolls.

The highways that connect Toluca with Mexico City and Guadalajara are being expanded and modernized due to the "Mexiquese Outer Loop" (Circuito Exterior Mexiquense) project, which aims to improve major highways leading from Mexico City to the rest of the country.  One proposed highway, called Autopista Lerma - Tres Marías y Ramal Tenango (Lerma - Tres Marías and Tenango branch highway), aims to improve transit between Toluca and Cuernavaca, as well as other cities to the south.  Currently, almost all major roadways serving Toluca transit in the north. It will allow transit from Toluca to southern and eastern destinations bypassing Mexico City but connecting the city with the Mexico City–Cuernavaca highway.  However, the project is opposed by Greenpeace Mexico as well as a number of local groups, primarily due to the possible damage it can cause to the "Great Water Forest" "Gran Bosque del Agua" forest, which contains an important aquifer for the Toluca, Cuernavaca and Mexico City metropolitan areas. There are also concerns that the highway will extend development into small towns that do not want it.

Rail
A commuter rail line known as Toluca–Mexico City commuter rail will connect Toluca to Mexico City. As of October 2020, it was estimated to open in 2023.

Airport
Toluca is served by Licenciado Adolfo López Mateos International Airport. This airport has started a development initiative of the Federal and State Governments, as well as the private sector, which provided an investment of almost 3,200 million U.S. dollars in the last 2 years.

This airport has created 4,500 jobs and has contributed to the increase of commercial activity for the metropolitan area. It has also attracted many airline passengers who live in Mexico City to use the Toluca airport, which represents migration in potential consumers of 2.2 million passengers in 2007 and it is projected that for 2008 up to five millions travelers may utilize the Toluca Airport, which would make it the 4th busiest in the country.

Bike sharing 
Toluca's Huizi public bike share system was launched in 2015 with 27 stations and 350 bicycles. The system is operated by PBSC Urban Solutions.

Education

Since Toluca is the capital of the State of Mexico, there are several diverse and important educational centers such as the state-funded public university, the Universidad Autónoma del Estado de México (UAEM). Also, it is home to major private universities, including campuses of the Universidad Tecnológica de México (UNITEC), Tecnológico de Monterrey (ITESM), and the Universidad del Valle de México.
There are currently 574 schools in Toluca, with about 8,320 teachers. The illiteracy rate is 7.33%, which is considered high.

UAEM, the state's public university, has its roots in the Literary Institute, later named the Scientific and Literary Institute, which was founded in 1828. It has been a prestigious institution and educated figures such as José María Heredia, Ignacio Ramírez, Felipe Sánchez Solís, Ignacio Manuel Altamirano and Adolfo López Mateos. The Institute became an autonomous university in 1956. The original building, situated downtown near Benito Juárez street, has been remodeled and houses the dean's offices.  The university has installations in various parts of the city, but the most noticeable is "Ciudad Universitaria" (lit. "university city"), a campus built around the hill Cerro de Coatepec. A monumental bust of Adolfo López Mateos, alumnus and  former president of Mexico (1958–1964), is displayed at the top of the hill.

Primary and secondary schools

Private schools in Toluca include:
 Instituto Simón Bolívar Toluca

Landmarks

The center of the town is the Zócalo, also known as Plaza de los Mártires ("Plaza of the Martyrs"), which includes buildings such as the Palace of the State Government and the Justice Palace (Palacio de Justicia). The square is named after events that took place after the Battle of Tenango Hill during the Mexican War of Independence.  Insurgent commander José Maria Oviedo was faced with the royalist army of Rosendo Porlier, who succeeded in driving the rebels northward to Toluca. Viceroy Venegas ordered reinforcements for Porlier's army and dispersed the insurgents, causing them to lose artillery and supplies.  In addition, the royalist forces took over a hundred prisoners and executed them in the main square.  The bodies of the prisoners were buried in a mass grave behind what is now the Municipal Palace.  A temple was built over the spot after the end of the Revolution. A monument to Father Miguel Hidalgo, the "father" of the Mexican Revolution is in the center of the square. It was created in Florence by Rivalta in 1899. The pedestal has reliefs depicting the storming of the Alhóndiga de Granaditas and the Battle of Monte de las Cruces.

The central plaza is surrounded by state and municipal government buildings. The state government palace and the Chamber of Deputies are recent constructions, but the buildings housing the state court and the municipal palace date from the 19th century. The state court building originally was the home of the state government and was designed by Ramón Rodriguez Arangoiti, who also designed the imperial wing of the Chapultepec Castle.  The municipal palace was completed in 1873 on land that once belonged to a Franciscan monastery. The Chamber of Deputies building contains murals done by Leopoldo Flores, which together are known as Construction: Images and Flight depicting man constructing buildings and himself at the same time. The municipal palace and the Chamber of Deputies are decorated with Neoclassic façades, but the other government buildings, built in the 1960s are faced with tezontle in the style of the 18th-century palaces in Mexico City.

The Temple of La Merced is one of the most ancient convents still preserved and one of the most important founded by Spaniards. It is a beautiful building of a religious order called mercenarios, and it shows architectural styles from the 18th, 19th, and 20th centuries. Its principal façade has 3 naves and was constructed in the 18th century on the remains of the old Temple of San Francisco. The interior of the temple exhibits neoclassical style with gold-leaf. It features oil paintings from the aforementioned times, such as the "Birth of San Pedro Nolasco", founder of the Mercenarios order. The temple became a hospice for orphans and beggars. Baroque construction style can be seen in the pilasters, niches and the order's shield. Inside, you can see paintings of Felipe Gutierrez, a Mexican painter who graduated from the San Carlos Academy.  It is located in downtown Toluca on Jose Ma. Morelos street.

Los Portales represent the social and commercial life of the city. They are a composed of three sets of arches or portals that extend on the 3 sides of the city block that extends behind the main cathedral. Behind the sets of arches there is walking space that takes you around the stores that are contained within.  The western arches follow the perimeter of what was the La Asunción Franciscan monastery. The eastern and southern arches were completed in 1836 by José María González Arratia. The original western arches were built by the Buenaventura Merlín.  Each side consists of basket-handle arches, each with a balcony. Each side has its own name. The eastern one, with 37 arches, is called "20 de Noviembre" or "Constitución"; the southern one, with 44 arches, is called "Madero" and the western one, with 35 arches, is called "Reforma".  There are four additional arches at the entrance to Avenida Independencia. Near Los Portales are some of the city's oldest businesses, some of which date from the 19th century such as the pharmacy on Calle Santos Degollado, a brass and iron workshop on Avenida Lerdo and a leather workshop on Avenida Juárez.

The Plaza de Fray Andrés de Castro is located next to Los Portales and connected to the older arches by means of a passageway with a transparent roof.  It is a semi-enclosed space which was once the sacristy of the La Asunción Franciscan Monastery. The sacristy was built by Felipe de Ureña and José Rivera and is essentially a reproduction of the Santa María del Puerto hermitage in Madrid and is one of the few remaining buildings of the old monastery. The square in front was recently remodeled but still contains traditional stores selling garapiña, traditional candies, tacos and other regional foods. The Municipal Historic Archive is located above the passageway leading to Los Portales.
The Cathedral of Toluca was begun in 1867 by José Francisco de Paula on land originally belonging to the Asunción de Toluca Franciscan monastery.  The building was originally designed by Agustín Carrillo. However, in 1870, Ramon Rodriguez Arangoiti redesigned the cathedral, based on his experience with old Roman basilicas although the present-day building still contains a number of the elements of the original design such as the aisle that runs parallel to the façade serving as a narthex, allowing access to the central and two side naves. The straight central nave is lighted by round arched windows. The outside façade consists of two parts. The first has seven columned areas, as well as niches with the images of Saint John, Saint Thomas, Saint Peter and Saint James. The second part rises above the main doors with three columned areas containing balconies, stained-glass windows and balustrades, terminating in a rectilinear pediment with an image of the Ascension of the Lord. In this, the cathedral shares design elements with the Cathedral of Mexico City. Above this, there is a clock with sculptures depicting the Fathers of the Greek Orthodox Church, Saint John Chrisotomus, Saint Basil the Great, Saint Athanasius and Saint Gregory of Nyssa.  The cathedral is topped by a dome with a bronze statue of Saint Joseph, who is the patron saint of the city, holding the infant Jesus. Overall the cathedral is a mix of styles, represents the various stages in which it was built and remodeled.

The Tercer Orden Temple is located to the side of the main cathedral. Its façade is integrated into the main cathedral's in the popular indigenous Baroque architecture of the 18th century. It was the seat of the bishopric until 1978, when it was moved to the main cathedral. The temple contains a number of paintings, including The Three Orders and The Family Tree of Saint Francis.The Cosmovitral is located in a stone and ironwork building in the center of Toluca, designed in 1910 by engineer Manuel Arratia in order to accommodate the "16 de Septiembre" market. It is now a botanical garden with more than 400 species of plants from all over the world. It also features a series of stained glass windows that are considered the largest in the world. These windows were created and designed by a Mexican artist named Leopoldo Flores. Cosmovitral was inaugurated in 1980 and completed in 1990. The stained glass ceiling represents the Milky Way and joins the "Hombre Sol" (Sun Man) with the Galaxy of Andromeda. It has a series of scenes that symbolize man's search of the light, the good and the wisdom to elevate his spirit to liberate him from the shadows of evil and the ignorance in an epic tale without beginning or end. At the spring equinox, the solar disc crosses the heart of "El hombre Sol" (the sun man), causing an explosion of light.

Toluca has a lot of green areas and among them is the Sierra Morelos park, this park is one of the largest in the city that covers 302 hectares is located on the slopes of Cerro de La Teresona and houses an important population of forests of pine, eucalyptus and oak.

The Santa Veracruz Temple is the home of a famous image of "Our Lord of the Holy Cross" also known as a "Black Christ". This image was originally housed in the San Francisco Temple, but the increasing number of worshippers dictated the building of its own sanctuary. Construction began in 1753, but because of friction between the Franciscans and worshippers, it was not completed until 1797. Although the original plans included two towers, only one was built, containing two hexagonal bodies, pairs of columns and balconies with semicircular rails.  Both bodies are topped with domes, each bearing a cross.  The space that was reserved for the second tower instead has an ornate clock.

Museums

Toluca, being the capital of the State of Mexico, is home of several important museums. It is second only to Mexico City in number of museums. Some of them honor important Mexican artists such as José María Velasco Gómez, Felipe Santiago Gutiérrez, and Luis Nishizawa, among others.

These museums are the following:
 The Museo de Bellas Artes (Museum of Fine Arts) was founded in 1945 by the ex-governor Isidro Fabela. It is the oldest museum of Toluca. It displays art by  José Juarez, Cristóbal de Villalpando, Miguel Cabrera, among others. It is housed in an 18th-century building that was once the "Descalced Carmelite Purísima Concepción" convent and built between 1697 and 1711. One of the most valuable pieces is a catafalque dating from the mid 18th century.  Since these artifacts were almost always burned by Church authorities, this is an extremely rare piece.
 The Museo de Ciencias Naturales (Museum of Natural Sciences) has been located in Matlatzinca Park since 1971. It was found by the ex-governor Carlos Hank González. It presents expositions related to natural sciences. Also it holds Luis Camarena González’s collections of butterflies, insects, mammals and crustaceans.
 The Museo de la Estampa (Print Museum) was dedicated in 1987 to graphic art. It displays lithographic, xylographic, chalcographic, serigraphic, offset and neographic art from Manuel Manilla, José Guadalupe Posada, Carlos Alvarado Lang, Alfredo Zalce, Rufino Tamayo, etc. It has seven display rooms and an embossing workshop.
 The Museo de la Acuarela (Watercolor Museum) was founded in 1993 and is one of the few museums in the world dedicated to watercolors. It has rooms dedicated to Mexican artists like Pastor Velázquez, Vicente Mendiola, Edgardo Coghlan, Ignacio Barrios and Ángel Mauro. It also has a Estado de México room with pieces which have won national prizes. It is located in a house that has always been known as "El Gallito" (Little Rooster), a name which appears in the crest of the main façade.
 The Museo de la Numismática (Numismatics Museum) was founded in 1987 by the state government in order to show Mexico's history through coins from the pre-Hispanic period up to the present day. It is one of a kind in Latin America. The collection of bills is very important because of its antiquity.
 The Museo José María Velasco (José María Velasco Museum) was founded in honor of one of the most famous landscape artists of the 19th century. It holds about 40 pieces from the artist as well as drawings and oil paintings. It has a library and a central patio where cultural events take place. The building was once occupied by Father Miguel Hidalgo before he fought in the Battle of Monte de las Cruces. Works on permanent display include: "The Volcanoes Seen from the Ocotlán Valley", "The Valley of Mexico from Molino del Rey" and "Self-Portrait".
 The Museo Felipe Santiago Gutiérrez (Felipe Santiago Gutiérrez Museum) also has a room of Mexican paintings from the 19th century. It has a collection of 225 oil paintings, watercolors and drawings which reflects Gutiérrez's evolution as an artist.
The Museo-Taller Luis Nishizawa (Luis Nishizawa Workshop-Museum) was founded in honor of the artist in 1992. It has 7 halls and a library specializing in art and an information center. It is located in the old El Cóporo neighborhood, housed in one of Toluca's oldest mansions which is mentioned in numerous 17th century documents.
 The Centro Cultural Mexiquense contains three museums. The Museo de Arte Moderno (Museum of Modern Art)  holds a great collection of Mexican paintings of the 20th and 21st centuries. The pieces come from other museums like Bellas Artes as well as from artist and institutional donations. Some of the artists represented are Gilberto Navarro, José Luis Cuevas, Siqueiros, Leopoldo Flores, etc. The Museo de Culturas Populares (Museum of Popular Cultures) displays a large collection of crafts, including items make of  wood, bones, glass, seeds, as well as textiles, traditional toys and regional candy and other foods. The Museo de Antropología e Historia (Museum of Anthropology and History) has more than 1000 pieces on display, with an introductory room, five archeological rooms, seven ethnographic rooms and one historical room. Its theme is Mexico's place in the evolution of the hemisphere's history and geography, as well as the geopolitical and strategic importance of the State of Mexico. Some of the finest Aztec stone sculptures are on display, including an important image of the god Ehecatl.
 The Museo de Sitio (Site Museum) at Calixtlahuaca is located just north of the modern city of Toluca in its municipality. This small museum has some of the finds excavated at the site in the 1930s. It has a circular form in imitation of the famous circular temple of Calixtlahuaca.
The CASART or Casa de Artesanias (House of Handcrafts) is located on Avenida Tollocan near the highway leading to Mexico City. This large outlet run by the government specialized in crafts produced in the Toluca Valley area. Items include sweaters from Gualupita, rebozos (shawls) from Tenancingo, rugs from Temoaya, pottery from Metepec, Temascalcingo and Valle de Bravo, as well as wooden items from Santa María Rayón.
 The Museo Modelo de Ciencias e Industria (Modelo Museum of Science and Industry) is a science museum of Grupo Modelo, a leading company in the brewing industry.

Culture
Toluca is home to a series of traditional festivities such as the typical solemn "silent procession" that takes place every Holy Friday when the Catholic congregation from Toluca and its surroundings get together in the centre of the city to express their respect and devotion for Jesus Christ's sacrifice. Easter and Lent are celebrated in a similar way.

Currently, there are two official orchestras: a State one and a Municipal one. The one from the State is the Orquesta Sinfónica del Estado de México. Higher education institutions have marching bands, and in some towns there are wind bands.

The dancing institutions include the Instituto Mexiquense de Cultura. There are also schools of dance such as the Escuela de Bellas Artes and the UAEM.

There is also a youth marching band of Toluca called "Eagles of Anahuac". This band was formed about 35 years ago and was the first youth marching band in the country.

Food and drink

Mexican food mixes European and Mesoamerican elements. In Toluca the most famous dish is chorizo, a regional sausage made of ground pork and tomato sauce, pumpkin mole, pipian and other ingredients such as salt, pepper, white wine, almonds, potatoes, vinegar, garlic and chile. In Mexico, the word "chorizo"  is used as a nickname for anything (anybody) from Toluca.  Other popular dishes, which must be mentioned are "tacos de carnitas" (pork tacos) and "tacos de plaza" made of barbacoa, pork, chicharron (fried pork rind), papalo (Porophyllum ruderale), onion, coriander, nopales, cueritos, chili sauce, salt and lime.
The traditional food includes vegetables from the region such as "quelites", "quintoniles", "huazontles", spinach, "verdolagas", carrots, potatoes, tomatoes and so forth.

Toluca has a variety of traditional candies such as "alegrías", "jamoncillos" (a candy bar with flavors such as lemon, pineapple, apple or chocolate), "lemons" (lemons decorated with coconut), "chilacayotes" (pumpkin in syrup), "cocadas" (mainly made with coconut), "palanquetas" (a peanut bar covered with melted sugar).

Traditional drinks include "mosquito" and, as in many other regions of Mexico, "tepache". "Mosquito" is a drink obtained from the infusion of fruit in alcohol. "Mosquito" can be also flavored with sugar, syrup or honey. "Tepache", the popular beverage of fermented pineapple and other fruit, is not native to the Valley of Toluca since this tropical plant does not grow there.

Sports
Several professional clubs are based in Toluca:

Additionally, Toluca is home to the following amateur or college teams.

Toluca is home of the Liga MX football club Deportivo Toluca. Their home is one of the landmarks of the city, the Estadio Nemesio Díez (Nemesio Diez Stadium), located between Constituyentes and Morelos avenues downtown.  Its nickname is "La Bombonera" (The Bonbon Box).

Famous boxers often use Toluca as a training center. These have included Julio César Chávez and Puerto Rico's Wilfredo Vazquez, among others.

Professional wrestler Tito Santana is billed from Toluca, although he is actually from Mission, Texas.

Notable people

 Alejandro Ariceaga
 José María Bustamante
 Ángel María Garibay K.
 Luis Nishizawa
 Adriana Barraza
 Salvador Mejía Alejandre
 Alberto Chimal
 Ninel Conde
 Mayrín Villanueva
 Carmen Becerra
 Diego Gama
 Tito Santana
 Diego Luna

Twin towns – sister cities

Toluca is twinned with: 

 Da Nang, Vietnam (2015)
 Debrecen, Hungary (2015)
 Fort Worth, United States (1998)
 Nanchang, China (1988)
 Novi Sad, Serbia (2015)
 Ramallah and al-Bireh, Palestine (2014)
 Saitama, Japan (1979)
 Suwon, South Korea (1999)

See also

 List of highest large cities in the world

Notes

References

Sources
Link to tables of population data from Census of 2005 INEGI: Instituto Nacional de Estadística, Geografía e Informática
México  Enciclopedia de los Municipios de México

External links
 Official Ayuntamiento de Toluca website—

 
Cities in Mexico
Capitals of states of Mexico

Populated places established in 1522
1522 establishments in New Spain
1520s establishments in Mexico
1522 in New Spain
Matlatzinca settlements
Nahua settlements
Otomi settlements
Mazahua settlements